Bräkne-Hoby is a locality situated in Ronneby Municipality, Blekinge County, Sweden with 1,689 inhabitants in 2010.

It has a middle school and used to have a högstadie (junior-high school). Bräkne-Hoby Parish is a parish in the Church of Sweden. Historically the inhabitants of the parish belonged to Bräkne Hundred in Blekinge. Later a civil parish responsible for municipal tasks, became the separate entity Bräkne-Hoby.

References 

Populated places in Ronneby Municipality